Joseph Allan Strain (born April 30, 1954) is a former a professional baseball player who was an infielder in the Major Leagues from  to  for the San Francisco Giants and Chicago Cubs.

Strain currently resides in the home rule municipality of Centennial, Colorado.

External links

Major League Baseball second basemen
Chicago Cubs players
San Francisco Giants players
San Francisco Giants scouts
Minor league baseball managers
Baseball players from Denver
1954 births
Living people
Pan American Games medalists in baseball
Pan American Games silver medalists for the United States
Baseball players at the 1975 Pan American Games
Northern Colorado Bears baseball players
Medalists at the 1975 Pan American Games
Fresno Giants players
Great Falls Giants players
Iowa Cubs players
Oklahoma City 89ers players
Phoenix Giants players